Keith Mitchell (born January 7, 1992) is an American professional golfer on the PGA Tour.

Early life and college career
Mitchell was born on January 7, 1992, in Chattanooga, Tennessee and attended the Baylor School there. He played college golf from 2011 through 2014 at the University of Georgia, where he majored in Business and Real Estate.

Professional career

2015 season
Mitchell played on the PGA Tour Latinoamérica in 2015 where his best finish was runner-up at the Brazil Open; he had four other top-ten finishes. He earned $44,295 in 14 starts on that tour.

2016–2017 seasons
Mitchell played on the Web.com Tour in 2016 and 2017. He began with a sponsor's invite to the 2016 Panama Claro Championship, where he finished 14th. 

Mitchell played well enough in the 2017 Web.com Tour Finals to earn his PGA Tour card for 2018. His best finish on that tour, that year, was third at the 2017 News Sentinel Open. He also finished with a tie for 11th at a PGA event in March 2017, the Valspar Championship, earning $144,900.

2018 season
Mitchell finished runner-up at the 2018 Corales Puntacana Resort and Club Championship on the PGA Tour. He ranked No. 7 on the PGA tour in strokes gained off-the-tee, which measures player performance off the tee on all par 4s and par 5s, and was ranked No. 10 Mitchell for average driving distance, at 312.6 yards.

2019 season
On March 3, 2019, Mitchell got his first professional victory at The Honda Classic in Palm Beach Gardens, Florida. Sinking a  birdie putt on the final hole, he won by one stroke, avoiding a playoff with runners-up Rickie Fowler and Brooks Koepka.  In Mitchell's previous four events, he had made only one cut, 73rd at the Phoenix Open. The win moved him up 93 places in the world rankings, from 161 to 68.

2022 season 
For the 2022 season, Mitchell had six top-ten finishes, a career high. He played in 26 tournaments, making the cut in 20 of them. His best result of the season was a tie for third at The CJ Cup.

When asked in June 2022 about a potential $20 million payout to join LIV Golf, Mitchell said "No chance". "If the LIV tour was such a good model, guys would go for free or for a lot less," Mitchell said.

Professional wins (1)

PGA Tour wins (1)

Results in major championships
Results not in chronological order in 2020.

CUT = missed the half-way cut
"T" = tied
NT = No tournament due to COVID-19 pandemic

Results in The Players Championship

CUT = missed the halfway cut
"T" indicates a tie for a place
C = Canceled after the first round due to the COVID-19 pandemic

Results in World Golf Championships

1Cancelled due to COVID-19 pandemic

QF, R16, R32, R64 = Round in which player lost in match play
NT = No tournament
"T" = Tied
Note that the Championship and Invitational were discontinued from 2022.

See also
2017 Web.com Tour Finals graduates

References

External links
 
 

American male golfers
Georgia Bulldogs men's golfers
PGA Tour golfers
Korn Ferry Tour graduates
Golfers from Tennessee
Golfers from Georgia (U.S. state)
Sportspeople from Chattanooga, Tennessee
People from St. Simons, Georgia
1992 births
Living people